McDade is an unincorporated community in Orange County, North Carolina, United States, located between Carr and Cedar Grove. It lies at an elevation of 728 feet (222 m).

References

Unincorporated communities in Orange County, North Carolina
Unincorporated communities in North Carolina